Kampong Mentiri is a village in the north-east of Brunei-Muara District, Brunei.

Geography 
Kampong Mentiri is one of the villages in Mukim Mentiri, a mukim in Brunei-Muara District. As a village subdivision, it borders Kampong Sungai Buloh to the north, Kampong Batu Marang to the northeast, RPN Kampong Mentiri to the east, Kampong Pangkalan Sibabau to the southeast, Kampong Sungai Besar to the south and RPN Panchor Mengkubau to the west.

Infrastructure

Schools 
Primary education is available in Mentiri and provided in Mentiri Primary School, a government school. There is also a primary religious school, Pengiran Anak Puteri 'Azemah Ni'matul Bolkiah Religious School, which provides primary religious education for the resident Muslim pupils.

Mosque 
Kampong Mentiri Mosque is the village mosque; it was inaugurated on 27 January 1984 and can accommodate 600 worshippers.

References

External links 
 Mentiri's official blog 

Mentiri